The men's 110 metres hurdles event at the 2017 Summer Universiade was held on 26 and 27 August at the Taipei Municipal Stadium in Taipei, Taiwan.

Medalists

Results

Heats
Qualification: First 3 in each heat (Q) and next 4 fastest (q) qualified for the semifinals.

Wind:Heat 1: 0.0 m/s, Heat 2: -2.4 m/s, Heat 3: -4.0 m/s, Heat 4: -2.8 m/s

Semifinals
Qualification: First 3 in each heat (Q) and the next 2 fastest (q) qualified for the final.

Wind:Heat 1: +0.9 m/s, Heat 2: -2.0 m/s

Final

Wind: -0.5 m/s

References

Athletics at the 2017 Summer Universiade
2017